The Gloster A.S.31 Survey was a 1920s British photo-survey biplane developed by the Gloster Aircraft Company from the de Havilland DH.67 design project.

Background
In 1926, the Aircraft Operating Company, an official contractor to the British Ordnance Survey for aerial survey work overseas, required a replacement for the converted Airco DH.9s that formed the majority of its fleet.

The requirements included maximum reliability, all-metal construction so that it could operate in the tropics or the arctic, a preference that it could be broken down into parts for transport.
It should be able to maintain height at 9,000 ft on a single engine while fully laden.

It approached the de Havilland Aircraft Company which prepared a design for a twin-engined biplane of metal construction, resembling a smaller version of the de Havilland Hercules to meet the specification, designated de Havilland DH.67. However, de Havilland was busy with production of the Hercules and DH.60 Moth and in November 1928 it transferred the project to Gloster Aircraft Company.

The customers requirement was for an aircraft that could be converted to a seaplane and capable of surveying large areas while operating from a single base.
Under Folland, Gloster comprehensively redesigned the aircraft with changes in all dimensions and for its own construction methods, the resulting aircraft being designated as Gloster AS.31 Survey.

Design and development
The Gloster Survey was a twin-engined biplane with a conventional landing gear and an open cockpit for two pilots, while a camera operator and survey camera could be accommodated in the enclosed cabin. 
The entirety of the front portion of the floor of the aircraft was glazed for so that three cameras could be installed.

It was powered by two 525 hp (392 kW) Bristol Jupiter XI engines, mounted on top of each lower wing. Provision was made in the design to take alternative engines including the Armstrong Siddeley Jaguar, Pratt & Whitney Hornet, Lorraine-Dietrich 14Asc and Wright Cyclone.

Operational history
In June 1929, the prototype Survey (G-AADO) made its first flight. It was handed over to the Aircraft Operating Company on 25 January 1930 on an occasion patronised by the Secretary and Under-secretary for Air. It had the ability to fly effectively on the power of one engine alone.
On 20 March 1930, piloted by Alan S. Butler, it departed from Heston Aerodrome for a survey of Northern Rhodesia, covering the 7,000 miles at an average speed of 128 mph. On 11 April 1930 it reached Cape Town. During 1931, it successfully surveyed .

It was used for further surveys over the next few years, not requiring replacement of any major components in 500 flying hours. In March 1935, it was sold to the South African Air Force and operated for aerial photography until it was broken up at Waterkloof in December 1942.

A second Gloster Survey (K2602) was built for the British Air Ministry, and in November 1931 it was delivered to the Royal Aircraft Establishment at Farnborough. It was employed for radio experiments, and remained in use until 1936.

Gloster received interest from Egypt for a bomber reconnaissance version to Egypt and quoted £11,000 per aircraft, but no order was placed.

Operators
South Africa
South African Air Force
United Kingdom
Aircraft Operating Company
Royal Aircraft Establishment

Specifications

See also

Notes

References

External links

 Civil Aviation Authority Registration Document G-AADO

1920s British civil utility aircraft
Survey
Aircraft first flown in 1929
Biplanes
Twin piston-engined tractor aircraft